The Penrhyn Main Line class was a class of three narrow gauge steam locomotives built for the Penrhyn Quarry Railway (PQR). These locomotives were built by the Hunslet Engine Company between 1882 and 1893 and supplied specifically to work the railway that connected the Penrhyn Quarry near Bethesda in north Wales to Port Penrhyn on the Menai Strait.

Penrhyn Quarry Railway 
The original locomotives to work the "main line" of the PQR were a series of horizontal boilered De Winton locomotives delivered in 1879. These proved inadequate for the task of moving substantial quantities of slate over the railway and in 1882 a more conventional locomotive was ordered from Hunslet to work the railway. This was the first of the "Main Line class" locomotives Charles. Charles was joined in 1893 by two more locomotives to the same design but slightly enlarged, which were named Linda and Blanche. These were the sole locomotives built to this design.

Preservation 

All three locomotives were preserved after the closure of the PQR. Charles was donated to the Penrhyn Castle Railway Museum.

Linda was loaned to the nearby Ffestiniog Railway in July 1962. For the 1963 season the locomotive was regauged to the Ffestiniog's  and purchased, along with Blanche at the end of the year. Both have since received extensive modifications including tenders, pony trucks and superheating.

Technical specification 

The following technical specification are for the locomotives as delivered from Hunslet and are from unless otherwise stated:

See also
Ruislip Lido Railway – Mad Bess is a  gauge miniature railway locomotive based on Blanche
Ffestiniog Railway rolling stock

References 

0-4-0ST locomotives
2-4-0 locomotives
Hunslet narrow gauge locomotives
Preserved narrow gauge steam locomotives of Great Britain